Günther Stein or Gunther Stein was a German print journalist.

Stein was a foreign correspondent in China for the Manchester Guardian, The Christian Science Monitor, and the Associated Press. He was later accused of communist sympathies and spying.

Erwin Canham, editor of the Monitor during this period, wrote later of Stein's brief contribution to the paper from Japan and China which ended in 1945. He refers to later reports of Stein working for the Soviet Union while in Japan and an alleged connection with the Sorge spy ring. He refers to Stein as "enigmatic" and agrees with General Charles A. Willoughby saying that Stein was a "man about whom too little is known."

Senator Joseph McCarthy later accused Stein of spying for China during the Red Scare, as part of the Sorge spy ring.

Ralph de Toledano wrote that in 1942 the Institute of Pacific Relations invited Stein to become its Chungking correspondent, from where he wrote books and articles to convey the idea that the Chinese Communists were "a superlative breed of idealists."

References

Bibliography
Made in Japan, Methuen, 1935, 206 pages
Far East in Ferment, Methuen, 1936, 244 pages
Chungking Considers the Future, American Institute of Pacific Relations, 11 pages, 1942
The Challenge of Red China, Da Capo Press, 1945, 490 pages
American Business With East Asia: A study of economic relations between the United States and East Asia, 1946-1947., American Institute of Pacific Relations, 1947
The World the Dollar Built, D. Dobson, 1952, 288 pages

External links
Mao's interview with German journalist Gunther Stein

German journalists
German male journalists
Year of birth missing
Year of death missing
German male writers
Associated Press people
The Christian Science Monitor people
Emigrants from Nazi Germany